Stephen Barnham (died 1608), of London, Denne, Horsham and later of Southover, near Lewes, Sussex, was an English politician.

He was a Member (MP) of the Parliament of England for Chichester in 1601.

References

16th-century births
1608 deaths
English MPs 1601
Politicians from Sussex
People from Horsham
People from Lewes